Matapihi is a suburb and peninsula of Tauranga in the Bay of Plenty region of New Zealand's North Island, surrounded on most sides by the Tauranga Harbour.

It is connectected to Mount Maunganui in the northeast by a landbridge, and Maungatapu in the southwest by Maungatapu Bridge. State Highway 29A runs through the suburb along this diagonal.

The suburb has two marae. Hungahungatoroa or Whakahinga Marae and Tāpuiti meeting house is a meeting place of the Ngāi Te Rangi hapū of Ngāi Tukairangi. Waikari Marae and Tapukino meeting house is a meeting place of the Ngāi Te Rangi hapū of Ngāti Tapu.

Demographics

Matapihi had a population of 729 at the 2018 New Zealand census, an increase of 54 people (8.0%) since the 2013 census, and an increase of 48 people (7.0%) since the 2006 census. There were 189 households, comprising 372 males and 357 females, giving a sex ratio of 1.04 males per female. The median age was 37.2 years (compared with 37.4 years nationally), with 171 people (23.5%) aged under 15 years, 135 (18.5%) aged 15 to 29, 342 (46.9%) aged 30 to 64, and 81 (11.1%) aged 65 or older.

Ethnicities were 36.6% European/Pākehā, 77.4% Māori, 2.1% Pacific peoples, 0.8% Asian, and 1.2% other ethnicities. People may identify with more than one ethnicity.

The percentage of people born overseas was 4.5, compared with 27.1% nationally.

Although some people chose not to answer the census's question about religious affiliation, 35.4% had no religion, 32.5% were Christian, 26.7% had Māori religious beliefs and 0.4% had other religions.

Of those at least 15 years old, 87 (15.6%) people had a bachelor's or higher degree, and 141 (25.3%) people had no formal qualifications. The median income was $25,400, compared with $31,800 nationally. 72 people (12.9%) earned over $70,000 compared to 17.2% nationally. The employment status of those at least 15 was that 273 (48.9%) people were employed full-time, 84 (15.1%) were part-time, and 42 (7.5%) were unemployed.

Education

References

Suburbs of Tauranga
Populated places around the Tauranga Harbour